Poison dart frog (also known as dart-poison frog, poison frog or formerly known as poison arrow frog) is the common name of a group of frogs in the family Dendrobatidae which are native to tropical Central and South America. These species are diurnal and often have brightly colored bodies. This bright coloration is correlated with the toxicity of the species, making them aposematic. Some species of the family Dendrobatidae exhibit extremely bright coloration along with high toxicity, while others have cryptic coloration with minimal to no amount of observed toxicity. The species that have great toxicity derive this feature from their diet of ants, mites and termites. However, other species that exhibit cryptic coloration, and low to no amounts of toxicity, eat a much larger variety of prey. Many species of this family are threatened due to human infrastructure encroaching on their habitats.

These amphibians are often called "dart frogs" due to the Native Americans' use of their toxic secretions to poison the tips of blowdarts. However, out of over 170 species, only four have been documented as being used for this purpose (curare plants are more commonly used for Native American darts) all of which come from the genus Phyllobates, which is characterized by the relatively large size and high levels of toxicity of its members.

Characteristics 

They weigh 1 oz. on average. Most poison dart frogs are brightly colored, displaying aposematic patterns to warn potential predators. Their bright coloration is associated with their toxicity and levels of alkaloids. For example, frogs of the genus Dendrobates have high levels of alkaloids, whereas Colostethus species are cryptically colored and are not toxic.

Poison dart frogs are an example of an aposematic organism. Their bright coloration advertises unpalatability to potential predators. Aposematism is currently thought to have originated at least four times within the poison dart family according to phylogenetic trees, and dendrobatid frogs have since undergone dramatic divergences – both interspecific and intraspecific – in their aposematic coloration. This is surprising given the frequency-dependent nature of this type of defense mechanism.

Adult frogs lay their eggs in moist places, including on leaves, in plants, among exposed roots, and elsewhere. Once the eggs hatch, the adult piggybacks the tadpoles, one at a time, to suitable water: either a pool, or the water gathered in the throat of bromeliads or other plants. The tadpoles remain there until they metamorphose, in some species fed by unfertilized eggs laid at regular intervals by the mother.

Habitat 
Poison dart frogs are endemic to humid, tropical environments of Central and South America. These frogs are generally found in tropical rainforests, including in Bolivia, Costa Rica, Brazil, Colombia, Ecuador, Venezuela, Suriname, French Guiana, Peru, Panama, Guyana, Nicaragua, and Hawaii (introduced).

Natural habitats include moist, lowland forests (subtropical and tropical), high-altitude shrubland (subtropical and tropical), moist montanes and rivers (subtropical and tropical), freshwater marshes, intermittent freshwater marshes, lakes and swamps. Other species can be found in seasonally wet or flooded lowland grassland, arable land, pastureland, rural gardens, plantations, moist savanna and heavily degraded former forest. Premontane forests and rocky areas have also been known to hold frogs.

Reproduction 

Many species of poison dart frogs are dedicated parents. Many poison dart frogs in the genera Oophaga and Ranitomeya carry their newly hatched tadpoles into the canopy; the tadpoles stick to the mucus on the backs of their parents. Once in the upper reaches of the rainforest trees, the parents deposit their young in the pools of water that accumulate in epiphytic plants, such as bromeliads. The tadpoles feed on invertebrates in their nursery, and their mother will even supplement their diet by depositing eggs into the water. Other poison frogs lay their eggs on the forest floor, hidden beneath the leaf litter. Poison frogs fertilize their eggs externally; the female lays a cluster of eggs and a male fertilizes them afterward, in the same manner as most fish. Poison frogs can often be observed clutching each other, similar to the manner most frogs copulate. However, these demonstrations are actually territorial wrestling matches. Both males and females frequently engage in disputes over territory. A male will fight for the most prominent roosts from which to broadcast his mating call; females fight over desirable nests, and even invade the nests of other females to devour competitor's eggs.

The operational sex ratio in the poison dart frog family is mostly female biased. This leads to a few characteristic behaviors and traits found in organisms with an uneven sex ratio. In general, females have a choice of mate. In turn, males show brighter coloration, are territorial, and are aggressive toward other males. Females select mates based on coloration (mainly dorsal), calling perch location, and territory.

Taxonomy 

Dart frogs are the focus of major phylogenetic studies, and undergo taxonomic changes frequently. The family Dendrobatidae currently contains 16 genera, with about 200 species.

Color morphs 

Some poison dart frogs species include a number of conspecific color morphs that emerged as recently as 6,000 years ago. Therefore, species such as Dendrobates tinctorius, Oophaga pumilio, and Oophaga granulifera can include color pattern morphs that can be interbred (colors are under polygenic control, while the actual patterns are probably controlled by a single locus). Differing coloration has historically misidentified single species as separate, and there is still controversy among taxonomists over classification.

Variation in predation regimens may have influenced the evolution of polymorphism in Oophaga granulifera, while sexual selection appears to have contributed to differentiation among the Bocas del Toro populations of Oophaga pumilio.

Toxicity and medicine 

The chemical defense mechanisms of the Dendrobates family are the result of endogenous means. Essentially this means that their ability to defend has come through the consumption of a particular diet. In fact, captive raised species exhibited non-detectable levels of toxins whereas the wild-caught species did as a result of their calcium and vitamin-rich Drosophila and cricket diet. The secretion of these chemicals is released by the granular glands of the frog. The discharge happens as a result of acetylcholine being released into the body which triggers the sympathetic or parasympathetic system depending on the species. The chemicals secreted by the Dendrobatid family of frogs are unique alkaloids that consist of greatly different and unique chemical structures and toxicity. It has been suggested that initially the granular glands were solely responsible for the production and synthesis of the diverse toxins in different species of Dendrobates, then through evolution the glands were adapted to also be responsible for storage, and then finally even the secretion of them upon triggering.

Many poison dart frogs secrete lipophilic alkaloid toxins such as allopumiliotoxin 267A, batrachotoxin, epibatidine, histrionicotoxin, and pumiliotoxin 251D through their skin. Alkaloids in the skin glands of poison dart frogs serve as a chemical defense against predation, and they are therefore able to be active alongside potential predators during the day. About 28 structural classes of alkaloids are known in poison dart frogs. The most toxic of poison dart frog species is Phyllobates terribilis. It is argued that dart frogs do not synthesize their poisons, but sequester the chemicals from arthropod prey items, such as ants, centipedes and mites – the diet-toxicity hypothesis. Because of this, captive-bred animals do not possess significant levels of toxins as they are reared on diets that do not contain the alkaloids sequestered by wild populations. In fact, new studies suggest that the maternal frogs of some species lay unfertilized eggs, which are laced with trace amounts of alkaloids, to feed the tadpoles. This behavior shows that the poisons are introduced from a very young age. Nonetheless, the captive-bred frogs retain the ability to accumulate alkaloids when they are once again provided an alkaloidal diet. Despite the toxins used by some poison dart frogs, some predators have developed the ability to withstand them. One is the snake Erythrolamprus epinephalus, which has developed immunity to the poison.

Chemicals extracted from the skin of Epipedobates tricolor may have medicinal value. Scientists use this poison to make a painkiller. One such chemical is a painkiller 200 times as potent as morphine, called epibatidine; however, the therapeutic dose is very close to the fatal dose. A derivative ABT-594 developed by Abbott Laboratories, called Tebanicline got as far as Phase II trials in humans, but was dropped from further development due to dangerous gastrointestinal side effects. Secretions from dendrobatids are also showing promise as muscle relaxants, heart stimulants and appetite suppressants. The most poisonous of these frogs, the golden poison frog (Phyllobates terribilis), has enough toxin on average to kill ten to twenty men or about twenty thousand mice. Most other dendrobatids, while colorful and toxic enough to discourage predation, pose far less risk to humans or other large animals.

Conspicuousness 
Conspicuous coloration in these frogs is further associated with diet specialization, body mass, aerobic capacity, and chemical defense. Conspicuousness and toxicity may be inversely related, as polymorphic poison dart frogs that are less conspicuous are more toxic than the brightest and most conspicuous species. Energetic costs of producing toxins and bright color pigments lead to potential trade-offs between toxicity and bright coloration, and prey with strong secondary defenses have less to gain from costly signaling. Therefore, prey populations that are more toxic are predicted to manifest less bright signals, opposing the classical view that increased conspicuousness always evolves with increased toxicity.

Aposematism 
Skin toxicity evolved alongside bright coloration, perhaps preceding it. Toxicity may have relied on a shift in diet to alkaloid-rich arthropods, which likely occurred at least four times among the dendrobatids. Either aposematism and aerobic capacity preceded greater resource gathering, making it easier for frogs to go out and gather the ants and mites required for diet specialization, contrary to classical aposematic theory, which assumes that toxicity from diet arises before signaling. Alternatively, diet specialization preceded higher aerobic capacity, and aposematism evolved to allow dendrobatids to gather resources without predation. Prey mobility could also explain the initial development of aposematic signaling. If prey have characteristics that make them more exposed to predators, such as when some dendrobatids shifted from nocturnal to diurnal behavior, then they have more reason to develop aposematism. After the switch, the frogs had greater ecological opportunities, causing dietary specialization to arise. Thus, aposematism is not merely a signaling system, but a way for organisms to gain greater access to resources and increase their reproductive success.

Other factors 
Dietary conservatism (long-term neophobia) in predators could facilitate the evolution of warning coloration, if predators avoid novel morphs for a long enough period of time. Another possibility is genetic drift, the so-called gradual-change hypothesis, which could strengthen weak pre-existing aposematism.

Sexual selection may have played a role in the diversification of skin color and pattern in poison frogs. With female preferences in play, male coloration could evolve rapidly. Sexual selection is influenced by many things. The parental investment may shed some light on the evolution of coloration in relation to female choice. In Oophaga pumilio, the female provides care for the offspring for several weeks whereas the males provides care for a few days, implying a strong female preference. Sexual selection increases phenotypic variation drastically. In populations of O. pumilio that participated in sexual selection, the phenotypic polymorphism was evident. The lack of sexual dimorphism in some dendrobatid populations however suggests that sexual selection is not a valid explanation.

Functional trade-offs are seen in poison frog defense mechanisms relating to toxin resistance. Poison dart frogs containing epibatidine have undergone a 3 amino acid mutation on receptors of the body, allowing the frog to be resistant to its own poison. Epibatidine-producing frogs have evolved poison resistance of body receptors independently three times. This target-site insensitivity to the potent toxin epibatidine on nicotinic acetylcholine receptors provides a toxin resistance while reducing the affinity of acetylcholine binding.

Captive care 

All species of poison dart frogs are Neotropical in origin. Wild-caught specimens can maintain toxicity for some time (this can be obtained through a form of bioaccumulation), so appropriate care should be taken when handling them. While scientific study on the lifespan of poison dart frogs is scant, retagging frequencies indicate it can range from one to three years in the wild. However, these frogs typically live for much longer than that in captivity, having been reported to live as long as 25 years. These claims also seem to be questionable, since many of the larger species take a year or more to mature, and Phyllobates species can take more than two years. Some species tolerate lower temperatures better than others.

Conservation status 

Many species of poison dart frogs have recently experienced habitat loss, chytrid diseases, and collection for the pet trade. Some are listed as threatened or endangered as a result. Zoos have tried to counteract this disease by treating captive frogs with an antifungal agent that is used to cure athlete's foot in humans.

Behavior as tadpoles 
The poison dart frog is known for its aggressive and predatory behavior. As tadpoles, the individuals of the genus Dendrobates are said to exhibit some unique cannibalistic tendencies, along with many other forms of predatory behavior. Dendrobates tadpoles that either consumed three or more conspecific tadpoles and/or relatively large larvae of a specific species of mosquito by the name of Trichoprosopon digitatum common in their environment led them to having a much higher growth rate and typically lived much longer lives. Reasons for this behavior could be that predation and aggression was selected for and favored for a few reasons. One reason is to eliminate predators, and the second reason is that it serves as a source of food in habitats that were low in resources. This predation could have evolved over time and led to cannibalism as another form of predatory behavior that had benefitted individuals survival fitness. However one observation has been noted in the general characteristic of Dendrobates tadpoles including D. arboreus, D. granuliferus, D. lehmanni, D. occultator, D. pumilio, D. speciosus, and many other Dendrobates species is that they have reduced mouth parts as young tadpoles which limits their consumption typically to unfertilized eggs only. Thus, it can be assumed that the cannibalistic tendencies of Dendrobates is limited to their lifetime as a tadpole and does not cross over into their adult life.

Aggressive behavior and territoriality 
The Dendrobatidae are a family of species very well known for their territorial and aggressive behavior not only as tadpoles, but as adults too. These aggression behaviors were not only limited to males, as many female Dendrobatidae also are known to defend their own native territory very aggressively. These areas that were being defended aggressively by Dendrobatidae were typically found to be regions that served as male calling sites. In fact, the males were seen wrestling with intruders of their territory in order to defend their calling sites as well as their vegetation. The different ways in which Dendrobatidae defended their own territories included physical combat and aggression. While vocalization and various behavioral displays served as a way of exhibiting one's strength or fitness, territorial disputes and fights led to physical combat and aggression at times too. Physical violence and aggression is particularly common at times of calling. If it was seen that an intruder was making calls in the territory of a Dendrobatidae frog then the resident frog would attempt to eliminate the competition to claim the territory and the females in it to himself. The resident frog would initially try to make its presence known by the means of vocalization and various behavioral displays as a way to exert dominance. If this did not scare away the intruder, then the resident frog would move towards the intruder and strike them. This encounter would immediately escalate into a full on fight where both are striking each other and grasping each other's limbs. Similarly, the females also often would get into fights and display aggressive behaviors in disputes over territory or a mating conflict. It was also observed that females who were going after the same male, after hearing their call, would chase each other down and wrestle to fight for the male. After a female courts with a male, they are also very likely to exhibit aggressive behavior towards any females that approach that male. Both the males and females bought their own respective sexes for each other in a fairly similar fashion.

Mating behavior 
Observations of the Dendrobatidae family suggest that males of the species would typically make their mating call in morning between the times of 6:30 am to 11:30 am. The calling would typically come from a place of elevation from various pieces of nature. The males would usually be on average one meter above the ground on limbs, trunks, and stems, or logs of trees so that their voice traveled further as well as the fact that it would help themselves be seen. The calls were signaled towards the stream as the females typically were in that area. Each male typically had their own region in which they only made calls from, and typically an individual would repeat their calls from the same spot during a mating season. After the call is received, the female makes its way to the male, and fertilization occurred in a few instances. This observed fertilization was not accomplished through amplexus. Initiation and interaction during courtship typically were the result of active females rather than males. The females stroked, climbed on, and jumped on the other in tactile courtship, and were by far the more active sex. The duration of courtship in poison frogs is long and females could even reject males even after an entire day of active following which was found to occur in a few instances. In the majority of cases, the males in fact chose the oviposition site and led the way and females usually followed the male to the site. In some Dendrobatidae species, such as strawberry poison frog, visual cues under high light intensity were also used to identify individuals from the same population. Different species use different cues to identify individuals from their same population during the time of mating and courtship.

Diet 
The diet of the Dendrobatidae is unique and vital in giving this family of frogs characteristics that are distinct from the rest. The diet of Dendrobatidae is what gives them the alkaloids that are found in their skin. This unique skin color and pigmentation and ability to transform color is an distinct feature that finds its basis in its diet. The diet is also what allows this family of frogs to have a defense mechanism such as poison, which is why it's commonly referred to as the poison dart frog. Both skin alkaloids and venoms and toxins are substances that can be from endogenous sources. Endogenous sources essentially means that the individual themselves is producing or synthesizing those substances on their own, or they can be obtained through exogenous sources like consumption. Researchers have studied these characteristics and have formed the diet-toxicity hypothesis which just implies that they believe that the diet of these Dendrobatidae is what gives them their toxicity and skin alkaloids. The data from numerous studies has led to the conclusions that there are direct correlations present between the frog's diet and its skin alkaloids that act as evidence to prove the diet-toxicity hypothesis. The diet that is responsible for these characteristics consists primarily of small and leaf-litter arthropods found in its general habitat, typically ants. Their diet, however, is typically separated into two distinct categories. The first is the primary portion of Dendrobatidae's diet which include prey that are slow-moving, large in number, and small in size. This typically consists of ants, while also including mites, small beetles, and minor litter-dwelling taxa. The second category of prey are much rarer finds and are much larger in body size, and they tend to have high palatability and mobility. These typically consist of the orthopteroids, lepidopteran larvae, and spiders. The natural diet of an individual dendrobatid depends on its species, prey abundance in its location, as well as many other factors. The available species present in the individual's enivornment can influence its diet vastly. Frogs of one species can specialize in preying on one particular prey, whereas another can focus on a different type of prey. The preference is one that depends on various factors that are calculated and decided upon as the most beneficial for one's own fitness.

Post-mating behavior 
Typically in many species the larger portion of parental investment falls on the shoulders of the female sex, whereas the male sex has a much smaller portion. However, it has been studied that in the family of Dendrobatidae, many of the species exhibit sex role reversal in which the females are competing for a limited number of males and the males are the choosers and their parental investment is much larger than the females. This theory also says that the female will typically produce eggs at an exceedingly fast rate that the males cannot possibly take full care of them which then leads to some of the males becoming unreceptive. Dendrobatidae also exhibit the parental quality hypothesis. This is where the females mating with the males try to ensure that their male mates with as few individuals as possible so that their number of offspring is limited, and thus each individual offspring receives a larger portion of care, attention, and resources. However, this creates an interesting dynamic of balance as there is a limited number of males available, and with many females competing for a limited number of males for courtship this makes it difficult ot limit the number of individuals a male mates with. Whereas in many species, the competition is flipped in that the competition is prominent among the males, among the Dendrobatidae it is the opposite as the females seem to have a great deal of competition among themselves for males. Females will even take the drastic measures and resort to the destroying of other female's eggs in order to make sure that the male they mated with is receptive and that it scares the male from mating with other females.

Threats

Parasites 
Poison dart frogs suffer from parasites ranging from helminths to protozoans.

Diseases 
Poison dart frogs suffer from chytridiomycosis, which is a deadly disease that is caused by the fungus Batrachochytrium dendrobatidis (Bd). This infection has been found in frogs from Colostethus and Dendrobates.

See also 

 Mantella – Malagasy poison frogs
 Poisonous amphibians

References

External links 

 Dendrobates.org – ecology, evolution and conservation of poison frogs
 Dartfrog.tk
 Poison Arrow Frog Facts
 Frognet – mailing list for dendrobatid hobbyists
 Some Pictures
 
 Frog Poison – Histrionicotoxin at The Periodic Table of Videos

Media 
 Dendrobatidae at CalPhotos
 Terrarium.tv

 
Dendrobatoidea
Aposematic species
Taxa named by Edward Drinker Cope
Neotropical realm fauna